The October 1679 English general election returned a majority of members in favour of the Exclusion Bill. Consequently, this parliament  was known as the Exclusion Bill Parliament. It did not assemble until 21 October 1680, and was dissolved three months later on 18 January 1681.

References

External links
History of Parliament Trust
History of Parliament on-line, Constituencies 1660–1690

17th-century elections in Europe
1679 in politics
General election
Elections to the Parliament of England